The 2009 Coca-Cola 600 was the twelfth stock car race of the 2009 NASCAR Sprint Cup Series and the fiftieth iteration of the event. It was held on May 25, 2009, at Lowe's Motor Speedway in Concord, North Carolina after being postponed on May 24 because of inclement weather. Scheduled for 400 laps on the  quad-oval, the race was won by David Reutimann of Michael Waltrip Racing after being shortened to 227 laps because of poor weather conditions. Ryan Newman finished second ahead of Robby Gordon, Carl Edwards, and Brian Vickers, who completed the first five positions.

Fox Sports televised the event in the United States, while the race was broadcast on radio by Performance Racing Network (over-the-air) and Sirius XM Radio (satellite)

On the day of the race, 1.33 inches of precipitation were recorded around the speedway; a significant amount of rain for the Charlotte area for the month of May.

Background
Lowe's Motor Speedway, now called Charlotte Motor Speedway, is one of ten intermediate tracks to hold NASCAR races; the others are Atlanta Motor Speedway, Kansas Speedway, Chicagoland Speedway, Darlington Raceway, Homestead-Miami Speedway, New Hampshire Motor Speedway, Kentucky Speedway, Las Vegas Motor Speedway, and Texas Motor Speedway. The standard track at Lowe's Motor Speedway is a four-turn, -long, quad-oval track. The track's turns are banked at twenty-four degrees; both the front stretch (the location of the finish line) and the back stretch (opposite the front) have a five-degree banking.

The Coca-Cola 600 was conceived by race car driver Curtis Turner who built the Charlotte Motor Speedway. It was first held in 1960 in an attempt by NASCAR to stage a Memorial Day weekend race to compete with the open-wheel Indianapolis 500; the two races were held together on the same day starting from 1974. The race is the longest (in terms of distance) on the NASCAR calendar and is considered by several drivers as one of the sport's most important races alongside the Daytona 500, the Brickyard 400 and the Southern 500. The event was known as the World 600 until 1984 when The Coca-Cola Company purchased the naming rights to the race and renamed it the Coca-Cola World 600 in 1985. It has been called the Coca-Cola 600 every year since 1986 except for 2002 when the name changed to Coca-Cola Racing Family 600.

Entry list

Qualifying

Pre-race festivities
Air Force Tops in Blue sang the national anthem. Bobby Allison, the race's grand marshal, gave the command to start engines. (It was not televised on Monday, instead, it was preempted by commercials.)

Race recap
Ryan Newman and Kyle Busch started on the front row followed by Jeff Gordon and Mark Martin in the second one, and Jimmie Johnson and Kasey Kahne in the third. Newman decided to start the race from the outside, switching positions with Busch.

At 12:12 pm EDT, the green flag waved marking the start of the 50th running of the Coca-Cola 600. After lap 1, Newman led the first lap with Busch in 2nd and Martin in 3rd. Two laps later, Busch took the lead from Newman while out of turn 4. On lap 7, the first caution flag was waved for light rain. Before the caution, Brian Vickers was in 5th after starting in 8th and Denny Hamlin was in that position after starting 13th. Dale Earnhardt Jr., starting in 27th, was in 31st. Eleven drivers entered pit road. Among them were Earnhardt Jr.; Kevin Harvick; Michael Waltrip; Greg Biffle; and Matt Kenseth.

When the restarted on lap 12, Busch had the lead followed by Newman, Martin, Kahne, and Vickers behind him. Shortly after, Harvick and Sam Hornish Jr. made contact on the backstretch. On lap 17, Harvick made contact with the outside wall entering turn 1, causing damage to his car and bringing out a caution. Busch reported an electrical problem with his car.

On lap 19, the race restarted with Busch, Newman, Martin, Kahne, and Gordon in the Top 5. By lap 35, Busch had opened a 2-second lead over Martin, who was 2nd. Tony Stewart, starting in 28th, was now in 15th. During pit stops on lap 42 after a competition caution, Johnson had the lead off pit road and gained 16 positions, followed by Busch and Martin. Newman had to come back to pit road for a lugnut replacement and Mike Bliss drove his car to the garage.

The race restarted on lap 45 with Johnson, Busch, Martin, Kurt Busch, and Denny Hamlin rounding out the Top 5. On lap 51, Ky. Busch took the lead away from Johnson with Martin still in 2nd. By lap 55, Johnson, with a loose car, had fallen to the 6th place. Rain returned by lap 71, resulting in yet another caution. After pit stops that followed, Carl Edwards gained 10 positions, Jamie McMurray gained 16, Reutimann gained 7, and Martin Truex Jr. gained 13. Vickers lost 6. Martin's crew lost a tire from their pit, resulting in a penalty for him. Robby Gordon stayed out and led a lap. Waltrip and Scott Riggs also stayed out. Approximately 55 minutes after the start of the race, the red flag was waved on lap 74 for rain. R. Gordon, Waltrip, Riggs, KY. Busch, Edwards, Reutimann, McMurray, Joey Logano, Kahne, and Juan Pablo Montoya made up the Top 10 at that time.

This red flag period lasted 54 minutes before caution laps resumed. R. Gordon, Waltrip, and Riggs made pit stops under the caution. Each of the three had a led at least a lap. The restart on lap 79 with Ky. Busch, Edwards, Reutimann, McMurray, and Logano in the Top 5. Martin served a penalty from the last pit stop and dropped to 37th place. By lap 87, Ky. Busch opened a two-second lead over second place Reutimann. On lap 93, McMurray dropped from fourth to 10th and Reutimann fell two spots from 2nd after making contact with the outside wall of Turn 4. Meanwhile, Earnhardt Jr. continued to fight an ill-handling car and on lap 111 Ky. Busch, who was leading, put him a lap down. On lap 120, Vickers took the lead from Ky. Busch. As of lap 122, Joe Nemechek, Waltrip, Harvick, and Max Papis, running 38th through 41st respectively, were a lap down. Green flag pit stops began at that point. On lap 129, Montoya took second from KY. Busch. Logano led lap 131. Reutimann and David Gilliland were deemed too fast on pit road and served penalties. Meanwhile, Dave Blaney led two laps under green flag pit stops. Blaney's stop on lap 134 ended the cycle and Ky. Busch regained the lead, followed by Vickers, Montoya, Kahne, and Johnson. Vickers took the lead on lap 146, and by lap 161, he had opened a 2.2-second lead over Montoya.

Historic moment of silence
On lap 163, race officials threw the red flag, and ordered the cars to shut down the engines on the front stretch for a moment of silence in honor of those who died in the service of America's military. This moment took place at 3:00 pm EDT; the time was chosen because it coincides with that traditionally set aside by American tradition on Memorial Day.  Members of pit crews and fans stood in observance, while drivers quietly reflected in their cars.  Although this moment was not originally planned — and indeed would not have occurred if the race had not been postponed the day before — it reportedly met with praise from drivers, crews and fans.

Pit stops and resumption of race
During the pit stops, Edwards gained six spots, Jeff Gordon gained twelve spots, Montoya lost three positions, and Vickers lost nine spots. The rain came and delayed the waving of the green flag. On lap 177, the red flag was waved for rain for the second time in the race three hours and eight minutes since the start. Kyle Busch, Kahne, Johnson, Edwards, Montoya, Logano, Kenseth, Jeff Gordon, Hamlin, and Vickers are in the top ten when the red flag waved.

The field restarted on lap 180 at 3:42 pm. EDT.  Twenty-six cars were on the lead lap as they took the green flag. On lap 182, Logano took fifth from Montoya and Johnson took second from Kahne. Seven laps later, Montoya, running in 7th, reported his car has tightened up. Kurt Busch, running in 15th, entered pit road for a two-tire change on lap 193 because of vibrations. Kurt Busch re-entered the race in 38th, one lap down. On lap 208, seven laps after halfway, Kyle Busch had a 2.4-second lead over Kasey Kahne. Kyle's brother, Kurt, advanced four spots from 38th since the pitstop for vibrations. On lap 213, Kenseth, running in 7th, reported his car has tightened up.

Eight laps later, rain hit the track again and forced another yellow flag for rain. On the ensuing stops, Edwards gained two spots, Vickers five spots, and Labonte seven spots. Johnson lost four spots. Reutimann, Newman, and Robby Gordon stayed on the track.

On lap 227, the third red flag of the race was waved with Reutimann, Newman, Robby Gordon, Edwards, Vickers, Kyle Busch, Kahne, Montoya, Logano, and Kenseth in the top ten. Hours later the race was called official giving Reutimann his first Cup series win in 76 starts. Newman, the polesitter, finished in second in his Stewart-Haas Racing Chevrolet. Robby Gordon finished third, his first top 5 finish since the 2007 Watkins Glen race Carl Edwards had the highest finishing Ford in fourth place. Kyle Busch had led the most laps (173), finished sixth. Kasey Kahne, the defending winner, had the highest finishing Dodge in seventh. Rookie Joey Logano finished ninth. Bill Elliott, in his 800 career start, finished 15th. Marcos Ambrose, the last driver on the lead lap, came in 26th.

Firsts
David Reutimann won his first race in the Sprint Cup Series.  It was also the first win for Michael Waltrip Racing in the Sprint Cup Series and the first for Michael Waltrip as an owner.  This was the first win for a car with the number 00 in Sprint Cup history and the first win for Toyota at Lowe's Motor Speedway in the Cup series. Also, due to the rainout, this marked the first time the actual race was held on Memorial Day. Also, this was the first Sprint Cup race at Charlotte to be held during the day since 2001.

Results

References

Coca-Cola 600
Coca-Cola 600
NASCAR races at Charlotte Motor Speedway
May 2009 sports events in the United States